This is a list of notable shopping malls in the Philippines. The retail industry in the Philippines is an important contributor to the national economy as it accounts for approximately 15% of the country's total Gross National Product (GNP) and 33% of the entire services sector. It employs some 5.25 million people, representing 18% of the country's workforce. The Philippine Retailers Association is the association of retailers, mall, and shopping center operators in the country.

Shopping malls by region

Bangsamoro (BARMM)

Bicol Region

Cagayan Valley

Calabarzon

Major shopping centers

Outlet malls

Community malls

Lifestyle malls

Caraga

Central Luzon

Central Visayas

Cordillera Administrative Region(CAR)

Davao Region

Eastern Visayas

Ilocos Region

Metro Manila

Mimaropa

Northern Mindanao

Soccsksargen

Western Visayas

Zamboanga Peninsula

Shopping malls under construction

Luzon

Visayas

Mindanao

Defunct

Philippine mall chains

Shopping malls play an important role in the Philippine economy. Major Philippine mall chains are located around the country, such as SM Supermalls, which has 70 malls around the country. Another major mall chain is Ayala Malls, which has 14 shopping malls serving nationwide. The Philippines has also other major mall chains such as Robinsons Malls, which has 50 shopping malls, Megaworld Lifestyle Malls, Vista Malls, Walter Mart, Gaisano Malls, NCCC Malls, Ever Gotesco Malls, Isetann and many more.

Gallery

See also 
 List of largest shopping malls in the Philippines

References

Lists of shopping malls
Shopping malls in the Philippines
Shopping malls